Mark Edmondson and Sherwood Stewart were the defending champions but lost in the semifinals to Brian Gottfried and Tomáš Šmíd.

Gottfried and Šmíd won in the final 6–4, 6–2 against Cássio Motta and Blaine Willenborg.

Seeds
Champion seeds are indicated in bold text while text in italics indicates the round in which those seeds were eliminated.

Draw

Final

Top half

Bottom half

External links
 1984 Volvo International Doubles draw

Doubles